is a former Japanese football player. He was born to a Japanese father and a Venezuelan mother. At the Asociación Paraguaya de Fútbol, Kitawaki played for Tacuary, 29 de Setiembre and Presidente Hayes. Between 2005 and 2012, Kitawaki endured sufficiently to perpetuate in the Asociación Paraguaya de Fútbol as one of few non-CONMEBOL players to do this, and holds the longest participation as an AFC footballer in Paraguayan football.

See also
 List of expatriate footballers in Paraguay
 Players and Records in Paraguayan Football

References

External links
J. League (#28)
Profile at ZeroZero.
Profile at BDFA

1985 births
Living people
Kokushikan University alumni
Association football people from Tokyo
Japanese people of Venezuelan descent
Japanese footballers
J1 League players
Japan Football League players
Club Tacuary footballers
Club Presidente Hayes footballers
Júbilo Iwata players
Azul Claro Numazu players
Japanese expatriate footballers
Japanese expatriate sportspeople in Paraguay
Expatriate footballers in Paraguay
Association football midfielders